The 1985 NBA playoffs was the postseason tournament of the National Basketball Association's 1984–85 season. The tournament concluded with the Western Conference champion Los Angeles Lakers defeating the Eastern Conference champion Boston Celtics 4 games to 2 in the NBA Finals. Kareem Abdul-Jabbar was named NBA Finals MVP for the second time (he had won the award under his birth name, Lew Alcindor, as a Buck in 1971).

The Lakers had been unsuccessful in their previous eight attempts to defeat the Celtics in the NBA Finals, losing 7 times from 1959–1969 and 1984. The Lakers, moreover, won the title in Boston, something no other NBA team has ever accomplished, and would be the only road team to clinch the title at Boston Garden.

The Cavaliers made the playoffs for the first time since 1978.

It was also the first time that all three teams from Texas made the playoffs in the same year.

The Denver Nuggets advanced to the conference finals for the first time since 1978 and would not advance that far again until 2009. The Philadelphia 76ers, on the other hand, advanced to the conference finals for the fifth time in six years, but would not reach that level again until 2001.

It was also the first time that Turner Broadcasting was covering the playoffs as TBS was the home for some playoff games.

Games 3 and 4 of the Eastern Conference Finals at the Spectrum forced a Phil Collins concert at the arena to be rescheduled to the fall of 1985, as noted by Charlie Van Dyke when he sub-hosted an episode of American Top 40 on July 6 of that year.

Bracket

First round

Eastern Conference first round

(1) Boston Celtics vs. (8) Cleveland Cavaliers

 Dennis Johnson blocks a World B. Free 3 with 2 seconds left.

This was the second playoff meeting between these two teams, with the Celtics winning the first meeting.

(2) Milwaukee Bucks vs. (7) Chicago Bulls

 Michael Jordan hits his first playoff game-winner with 22 seconds left.

This was the second playoff meeting between these two teams, with the Bucks winning the first meeting.

(3) Philadelphia 76ers vs. (6) Washington Bullets

This was the fourth playoff meeting between these two teams, with the Bullets winning two of the first three meetings.

(4) Detroit Pistons vs. (5) New Jersey Nets

This was the first playoff meeting between the Pistons and the Nets.

Western Conference first round

(1) Los Angeles Lakers vs. (8) Phoenix Suns

This was the fifth playoff meeting between these two teams, with the Lakers winning the first four meetings.

(2) Denver Nuggets vs. (7) San Antonio Spurs

This was the second playoff meeting between these two teams, with the Spurs winning the first meeting.

(3) Houston Rockets vs. (6) Utah Jazz

This was the first playoff meeting between the Rockets and the Jazz.

(4) Dallas Mavericks vs. (5) Portland Trail Blazers

This was the first playoff meeting between the Mavericks and the Trail Blazers.

Conference semifinals

Eastern Conference semifinals

(1) Boston Celtics vs. (4) Detroit Pistons

This was the second playoff meeting between these two teams, with the Celtics winning the first meeting.

(2) Milwaukee Bucks vs. (3) Philadelphia 76ers

This was the fifth playoff meeting between these two teams, with the 76ers winning three of the first four meetings.

Western Conference semifinals

(1) Los Angeles Lakers vs. (5) Portland Trail Blazers

 The CBS coverage of this game would mark the final on-air assignment for Frank Glieber (calling the game alongside James Brown); as Glieber died from a heart attack three days later at the age of 51.

This was the third playoff meeting between these two teams, with each team winning one series apiece.

(2) Denver Nuggets vs. (6) Utah Jazz

This was the second playoff meeting between these two teams, with the Jazz winning the first meeting.

Conference finals

Eastern Conference finals

(1) Boston Celtics vs. (3) Philadelphia 76ers

 Larry Bird makes the game-saving steal to advance to the Finals for the Celtics.

This was the 18th playoff meeting between these two teams, with the Celtics winning nine of the first 17 meetings.

Western Conference finals

(1) Los Angeles Lakers vs. (2) Denver Nuggets

 Dan Issel's final NBA game.

This was the second playoff meeting between these two teams, with the Lakers winning the first meeting.

NBA Finals: (E1) Boston Celtics vs. (W1) Los Angeles Lakers

 "Memorial Day Massacre"

 Kareem Abdul-Jabbar breaks Jerry West's all-time playoff scoring record.

 Dennis Johnson hits the game-winner at the buzzer.

 The Lakers become the only road team to win the NBA title in Boston Garden and it did again  the  2021-22 golden state warriors did in 2022 NBA Finals.

This was the ninth playoff meeting between these two teams, with the Celtics winning the first eight meetings.

References

External links
 Basketball-Reference.com's 1985 NBA Playoffs page

National Basketball Association playoffs
Playoffs
Sports in Portland, Oregon

fi:NBA-kausi 1984–1985#Pudotuspelit